Morty O'Shea (13 January 1882 – 19 August 1970) was an Irish Gaelic footballer who played as a full-back for the Cork senior team.

O'Shea made his first appearance for the team during the 1910 championship and was a regular member of the starting fifteen until his retirement after the 1913 championship. During that time he won one All-Ireland medal and one Munster medal.

At club level O'Shea won several county club championship medals with Lees and Bantry.

Honours

Adrigole
Beara Junior Football Championship: 1929

Lees
Cork Senior Football Championship: 1911

Cork
All-Ireland Senior Football Championship: 1911
Munster Senior Football Championship: 1911

References

1882 births
1970 deaths
Bantry Blues Gaelic footballers
Lees Gaelic footballers
Cork inter-county Gaelic footballers
Winners of one All-Ireland medal (Gaelic football)